Heuqueville is a commune in the Seine-Maritime department in the Normandy region in northern France.

Geography
The English Channel and huge limestone cliffs form the western border of the commune.

Population

Places of interest
 The church of St.Pierre, dating in part from the sixteenth century.
 The motte of an old castle.

See also
Communes of the Seine-Maritime department

References

External links

Heuqueville on the Quid website 

Communes of Seine-Maritime
Populated coastal places in France